Alessia Orro (born 18 July 1998) is an Italian volleyball player. She competed in the women's tournament at the 2016 Summer Olympics. She also participated at the 2019 Montreux Volley Masters.

Awards

Individuals
 2021 Women's European Volleyball Championship - "Best Setter"
 2022 FIVB Nations League - "Best Setter"

References

External links
 

1998 births
Living people
Italian women's volleyball players
Olympic volleyball players of Italy
Volleyball players at the 2016 Summer Olympics
People from Oristano
Volleyball players at the 2020 Summer Olympics
Sportspeople from Sardinia
Sardinian women
21st-century Italian women